About fifty Symphyotrichum novae-angliae cultivars were in commerce . , twelve had won the Royal Horticultural Society's Award of Garden Merit (AGM).

List of cultivars
Flower size, colour, approximate maximum height, image, and other details for each Symphyotrichum novae-angliae cultivar, when available, are given in the list that follows.

References

novae